The Numaligarh Refinery, located at Morangi, Golaghat district, Assam in India. Numaligarh Refinery Limited (NRL) is a Government of India Enterprise, it is a group company of Oil India Limited (earlier subsidiary of BPCL) and the present shareholding pattern of NRL is Oil India-80.16%, Govt. of Assam (GoA)-15.47% and Engineers India Ltd (EIL) – 4.37%. NRL is a Category-I Mini Ratna PSU and it is one of 4 refineries in Assam. The other 3 refineries in Assam are owned by M/s IOCL. It opened in 1999. The commercial production commenced from 1st October, 2000.

, it had a capacity of 3 million metric tonnes per year. In January 2019, the Cabinet Committee on Economic Affairs approved plans to increase the refinery's capacity to 9 million metric tonnes per year.

References

External links 

 

Companies based in Assam
Oil refineries in India
Energy in Assam
Golaghat district
Bharat Petroleum buildings and structures
1999 establishments in Assam